Food safety incidents in Taiwan have received international media scrutiny.

2011: Plasticizer use in food products
The principal food safety incident in Taiwan was over the use of the plasticizer DEHP to replace palm oil in food and drinks as a clouding agent. The chemical agent has been linked to developmental problems with children as it affects hormones.

The food affected includes beverages, fruit juices, bread, sports drinks, tea, and jam.

After two years of investigations, the Taiwanese government levied NT$1.2 million (approx. US$40,000) in fines against 37 companies, or slightly more than US$1000 per company.

History 
In mid-May 2011, the Republic of China authorities reported that two Taiwanese companies Yu Shen Chemical Co. and Pin Han Perfumery Co. were using plasticizer DEHP in clouding agents the firms manufactured. This was used as a substitute for palm oil in clouding agents as a way to keep cost down and improve profits. However, Wei Te Chemical Co., a manufacturer of clouding agents, claims that "the reason most businesses tended to utilize illegal clouding agents was not because of price, but rather the long preservation periods and esthetically pleasing effect of using DEHP-laced products."

Near the end of May 2011, the government of the Republic of China had begun seizures of contaminated products and announced a ban from exporting. Later, the list for government safety checks was extended to syrups, tablets, pastries, and powders. By 27 May 2011, "up to 465,638 bottles of DEHP-tainted beverages have been pulled out from store shelves. Also, up to 270,822 boxes and 68,924 packs of powdered probiotics and 28,539 kilos of fruit juices, fruit jam, powder and syrup, and yoghurt powder have been removed from shelves", according to EcoWaste Coalition and a report from Taiwan's Food and Drug Administration (FDA).

As of mid-June, there are roughly 900 products which have been recalled from nearly 40,000 Taiwanese retailers. Some media reports, including in The Economist, conclude that Taiwan's former reputation as a reliable and safe food manufacturing country has been damaged.

Taiwanese prosecutors alleges that one of the company Yu Shen at the centre of the crisis has used 5 tonnes of DEHP every month to manufacture clouding agents which is supplied to food processing firms and pastry shops. There were 95 Taiwanese manufacturers which had used the DEHP ingredient. A further 244 ingredient manufacturing firms had also used the DEHP.

Reactions

Domestic 
Ma Ying-jeou has said that the government health units have launched the nation's largest-ever action to secure food safety by checking up to 16,000 food makers and outlets and removing from sales stands over 20,000 food and beverage items suspected of being contaminated with DEHP.

Health officials have inspected over 14,000 food vendors and stores around the island, taking over 20,000 products off shelves.

Ma has been criticized by the opposition DPP for his handling of the scandal. Opposition spokesperson Lin Yu-chang pushed the Ma Ying-jeou administration to come out with a new "D-Day" to combat the national plasticizer scare. The KMT criticized the DPP for their inability to detect DEHP while it was in power. They pointed out that DPP legislator Huang Sue-ying spoke against placing DEHP on the EPA's class-1 control list of toxic substances. KMT legislator Chiu Yi also alleged that the DPP had ties with the owner of the Yu Shen Company, Lai Chun-chieh. Lai's son also claimed on his Facebook that DEHP was not responsible for cancer, contrary to studies that show otherwise.

International
Chinese mainland authorities banned 812 products from the original list of 22 from Taiwan. This include sports drinks, tea, jam, juices, and other beverages. China later upgraded the banned list to cover 1004 products.

In Hong Kong, authorities started monitoring its residents for contamination. They banned two types of Taiwanese sports beverage called Speed. Hong Kong's health secretary York Chow stated that because the ingestion of the carcinogen will be a health risk, he supported an outright ban of the DEHP agent. In neighboring Macau, health authorities found the antacid Scrat Suspension was tested positive for DIBP who later issued a notice of recall to local importers and pharmacies. Standard Chem＆Pharm had notified its retailers to pull the product off the shelves in Taiwan and Macau.

Malaysian authorities found some bubble tea products were contaminated with DEHP and the importers were instructed to halt importation and ceased distribution of the products in Malaysia.

Authorities in the Philippines banned DEHP affected products and carried out investigations of importers to ensure affected products were recalled. Vietnam and South Korea both banned affected Taiwanese products from importation.

In the United States, California-based 99 Ranch Market, one of the largest Asian grocery chains in the country, removed plasticizer-contaminated beverages imported from Taiwan, off store shelves.

2013: Cooking oil adulteration and mislabeling
In October 2013, a scandal broke out in Taiwan regarding the presence of chlorophyllin in cooking oil. Subsequent investigations unearthed widespread adulteration and mislabeling amongst cooking oil products sold in Taiwan. The resulting scandal affected many products, even outside cooking oil, such as health pills, alcoholic beverages, milk and rice.

Companies involved

Chang Chi Foodstuff Factory Co.
Chang Chi Foodstuff Factory Co. was found to have used copper chlorophyllin, an illegal coloring agent for cooking oil, in its olive oil and have adulterated its higher-end cooking oil with cheaper cottonseed oil. The company was fined NT$ 28.6 million in accordance to the Act Governing Food Sanitation after authorities have found that their products had been adulterated. In December 2013 company chairman Kao Chen-li was sentenced to sixteen years in prison for his role in the scandal. The company was also mandated to pay a further NT$50 million fine. A NT$1.85 billion fine levied by the Changhua County Public Health Bureau was annulled in July 2014 because Kao and two other company executives had already been jailed. Kao Tsung-hsien of the Ministry of Health and Welfare's Administrative Appeal Committee stated:

Flavor Full Food Inc.
Flavor Full Food Inc. was accused of blending cheaper cottonseed oil into more expensive cooking oils to increase their profit. On 26 October 2013, the company admitted of their wrongdoings through health officials. The company had adulterated 24 of its products sold in Taiwan with cheaper cottonseed oil, and also added flavoring agents to one of its peanut oil products. The company had been fined NT$ 8 million for 25 violations. The former chairman and his brother were each sentenced to sixteen months in prison and ordered to pay NT$25 million in September 2014. The company itself was ordered to pay a further NT$5 million fine.

Formosa Oilseed Processing Co.
Formosa Oilseed Processing Co. was found to intentionally mislabel their six cooking oil mixtures as pure olive oils. The company general manager issued an apology saying that the company will stop selling the small-package olive oil. The company was fined NT$ 15 million.

Geneherbs Biotechnology Co.
The weight-loss pills manufactured by the Geneherbs Biotechnology Co. were found to contain unauthorized drugs. The pills product called the Wellslim Plus+ contains cetilistat, a lipase inhibitor designed to treat obesity.

Sing-Lin Foods Corporation
In early November, sodium copper chlorophyllin was found on Wu Mu steamed spinach ramen noodles brand manufactured by Sing-Lin Foods Corporation.

Taisun Enterprise Co.
On 20 November 2013, the Food and Drug Administration of Ministry of Health and Welfare confirmed the grapeseed oil made by Taisun Enterprise Co. contains the prohibited food additive copper chlorophyllin complex.

Ta Lien Alcohol Company
The contents of 11 out of 12 alcohol products manufactured by Ta lien Alcohol Company were found not to match the ingredients listed on their labels as announced by the Department of Finance of Changhua County Government on 28 October 2013. The company was fined NT$ 5.5 million.

Ting Hsin International Group
The chairman of Ting Hsin International Group was indicted in early November 2013 on fraud charges because of mislabeling products and violating the Act Governing Food Sanitation in connection to adulterated oil purchased from Chang Chi Foodstuff Factory Co.

Wei Chuan Food Corp
Wei Chuan Food Corp were found to be involved in an adulterated cooking oil scandal. The chairman of the company offered a public apology during a press conference on 5 November 2013.

Reactions

Domestic responses
ROC President – On 23 October 2013, President Ma Ying-jeou pledged to strengthen inspection on food and beverage manufacturers and severely punish those with altered food products. He also ordered the Ministry of Health and Welfare to hold a national food safety conference in November 2013 to address the issues.

Executive Yuan – The Executive Yuan had announced that it is setting up a joint food safety inspection and control team between the yuan and Ministry of Health and Welfare and Council of Agriculture.

ROC Ministry of Health and Welfare (MOHW) – On 23 October 2013, Minister Chiu Wen-ta said that he took full responsibility for cracking down the 'black-hearted' food suppliers.

 Food and Drug Administration (FDA) – On 29 October, Deputy Head Wu Hsiu-ying said that the MOHW had drafted law amendments to increase penalties for any food fraud. The maximum fines would be increased, while the minimum fines would remain the same. FDA is also seeking heavier criminal penalties for manufacturers of adulterated or counterfeit food by longer prison serving duration. Rewards will also be given to any whistle blower exposing food fraud within his/her company.
 Deputy Minister Shiu Ming-neng held an interim press conference on 30 October 2013. There is a list of 37 cooking oil products in which he would ask the MOHW officials to go to those manufacturers and conduct investigation because of being suspected to contain fatty acid issues. The list consists of Taisun Enterprise Co., Ting Hsin International Group and Taiwan Sugar Corporation.

ROC Minister of Economic Affairs (MOEA) – Vice Minister Woody Duh said that the MOEA Industrial Development Bureau is reviewing the Good Manufacturing Practice (GMP) system and might require a manufacturer to present its export and import invoices and declarations and to allow on-the-spot inspection for its production line when it seek certification. He said that the MOEA will ensure that the GMP is a guarantee for safety, and without it consumers will be exposed more to unsafe foods.

ROC Environmental Protection Administration – Minister Stephen Shen said on 28 October that he would instruct local cleaning squads to accept and recycle oil bottles that still contain the adulterated oil.

Democratic Progressive Party – Former Chairman Shih Ming-teh said on 24 October 2013 that he and his friends would file a class-action lawsuit against Flavor Full Food Inc. to seek compensation over its adulterated oil products because his household's organic sesame oil was all from the company. Any compensation he receives from the lawsuit will be donated to charity organizations.

International responses

China
In Mainland China, a food distributor in Fujian filed a lawsuit against Chang Chi Foodstuff Factory Co. to seek damages for compensation. Xiamen had ordered 40,000 liters of cooking oil made by Chang Chi Foodstuff Factory Co. to be removed from shelves and stepped up inspections on edible oil products purchased from Taiwan.

Singapore
Singaporean food suppliers that source from Taiwan cooking oil companies involved in the food scandal were ordered to hold their shipping by the Government of Singapore on 22 October 2013.

United States
In United States, stores removed all Taiwanese foods tainted by the chemicals and other questionable products off the shelves.

2014: Gutter oil incident

The 2014 Taiwan food scandal refers to a series of food safety incidents in Taiwan that came to light in 2014. Adulteration of cooking oil with recycled waste oil and animal feed oil was discovered in September 2014.  Despite coming to light only in 2014, mass food adulteration by Taiwanese food conglomerates, however, has been suppressed for decades, and the food safety crisis has been among the reasons for the electoral defeat of the Kuomintang in late 2014.  At least 1,256 businesses were affected in the gutter oil scandal.

First case
The series of incidents first came to light on 4 September 2014, when it was discovered that tainted cooking oil was being produced by Kaohsiung-based company Chang Guann Co. and branded as Chuan Tung Fragrant Lard Oil. The company was found to have blended cooking oil with recycled oil, grease and leather cleaner. The recycled oil was processed by an unlicensed factory in Pingtung County owned by Kuo Lieh-cheng, who allegedly purchased the oil from waste recycler Hu Hsin-te, whose factory is named Shun Te Enterprises, located in the Daliao District of Kaohsiung.

Chang Guann purchased up to 243 tonnes of recycled waste oil disguised as lard from the Pingtung factory, starting in February 2014. The company then allegedly refined the waste oil before mixing it with processed lard and selling the tainted product to its distributors. The recycled waste oil was collected from restaurants, and included discarded animal parts, fat and skin.

The President of Chang Guann Co. apologized to the public on 4 September 2014. He emphasized that his company was not aware and did not intentionally buy the tainted oil, and that the oil the company purchased from the illegal Pingtung factory was not cheaper than oil from other oil suppliers.

On 11 September, reports revealed that in 2014, Chang Guann had also imported 87.72 tonnes of lard oil falsely listed for human consumption from Hong Kong-based Globalway Corp Ltd. (金寶運貿易) that were actually meant for animal use only. Since 2008, Chang Guann had imported 56 batches of lard oil weighing 2,385.1 tonnes from Hong Kong, about 300 tonnes of which were purchased from Globalway Corp between 2011 and 2014.

The Taiwan Food Good Manufacturing Practice Development Association (TFGMPDA) reported that the cooking oil produced by Chang Guann has never been awarded GMP certification, although the TFGMPDA issued an apology saying that five food companies whose products have won GMP certification have used the tainted oil.

Schools around Taiwan pulled all of the products containing the tainted oil from their school meals after 16 schools were discovered to be using the adulterated oil products.

Chang Guann was found in violation of the Act Governing Food Safety and Sanitation and fined NT$50 million. Yeh Wen-hsiang (葉文祥), chairman of Chang Guann, was arrested for fraud for his role in the scandal.

The FDA began indefinitely halting imports of edible lard oil from Hong Kong on 11 September.

On 1 October, prosecutors revealed that after viewing lab results, Kuo Lieh-cheng admitted that oil he sold to Chang Guann Co. was mixed with corpse oil, gutter oil, grease and leather cleaner, and recycled oil.

On 3 October the Minister of Health and Welfare Chiu Wen-ta resigned in the aftermath of the scandal.

Second case
On 9 October, prosecutors launched an investigation into a unit of Ting Hsin International Group (頂新國際集團) over sale of alleged tainted cooking oil. Prosecutor Tsai Li-yi said Ting Hsin unit Cheng-I Food Co. (正義股份有限公司) is being investigated over allegedly mixing animal feed oil with cooking oil and then selling it for human consumption.  Cheng-I Food Co. has an estimated 80 percent share of the lard and lard-based oil market in Taiwan.  Wei Ying-chung (魏應充), former chairman of three subsidiaries within Ting Hsin International Group and third of the four Wei brothers controlling the conglomerate, was previously indicted on charges of fraud as part of an investigation into the 2013 Taiwan food scandal.

After the revelations, the Taiwan public boycotted Ting Hsin items, with a number of local governments, restaurants, traditional markets and schools refusing to consume the conglomerate's products. On 16 October, Ting Hsin announced that it will leave Taiwan's oil market and donate NT$3 billion toward food safety under the supervision of Ruentex Financial Group (潤泰集團) Chairman Samuel Yin.

On 17 October, the Changhua District Court granted a request to detain Wei Ying-chung. On October 21, prosecutors said according to Ting Shin's Vietnamese oil supplier Dai Hanh Phuc, the majority of animal feed-grade oil imported by Ting Shin may be used in the China market. In response, consumers in China called for a united boycott against Ting Hsin products.

In November 2014, Ting Hsin's products were tested for Agent Orange since an unnamed source told authorities that the oil Ting Hsin imported from Vietnam may contain traces of the herbicidal weapon.

The Kaohsiung District Court ruled that Cheng-I Food owed NT$9.36 million in damages.

Third case
On 3 November, prosecutors in Tainan took Lu Ching-hsieh, owner of Beei Hae Edible Co. and Hsieh Ching Corp. and his wife, Lu Huang Li-hua, into custody on suspicion of manufacturing cooking oil using substandard oil. Prosecutors said Hsieh Ching had bought animal feed-grade beef tallow and vegetable oil from Jin Hong, a trading company, and then allegedly mixed the ingredients together for sale as cooking oil.

Affected companies
According to Taiwan's Food and Drug Administration (FDA), a number of companies made food products using the tainted oil, including well-known brands such as Taiwan Sugar Corporation, Ve Wong Corp., Chi Mei Frozen Food Co., Sheng Hsiang Jen Foods Co., Gourmet Master Co., Yilin Group, Hawdii Foods Co., etc. Restaurant chains, shops and stores were also affected, such as Good Morning, Wu Wha Ma Dumpling Home, Magie du Levain, Yu Jen Jai, Lee Hou Cake Store, Black Bridge Foods, Li Ji Cake Store, etc.

Wei-Chuan Food Corporation, a subsidiary of Ting Hsin International Group which was previously cited with using adulterated cooking oil in 2013, was also involved in using tainted cooking oil produced by Chang Guann. Its share price plummeted after the company announced a recall of 12 products made from the recycled oil: canned pork, pork sauces, meat paste and pork floss. The company promised refunds to its customers. The recall announcement subsequently also brought down the share prices of other related food companies.

Reactions

Domestic
 President Ma Ying-jeou made a public statement saying that the oil scandal happened due to lax inspection of food manufacturing factories by local governments, and he urged local municipalities to strengthen checks on those facilities. Democratic Progressive Party spokesman Huang Di-ying said President Ma should not shift the blame solely to the local governments since Chang Guann Co. has also allegedly imported over 2,400 tonnes of industrial-grade lard from Hong Kong over the last six years, with no foul play spotted by the central government.  
 Premier Jiang Yi-huah demanded the Legislative Yuan officials ensure food products containing the adulterated cooking oil be removed from store shelves and sealed. He also vowed to punish severely those who were involved in the making of the recycled oils, even though they met food safety standards.
 Vice Premier Mao Chi-kuo described the selling of recycled oil by Chang Guann Co. as a vile criminal act and demanded the most severe penalties for the perpetrators.
 The Ministry of Health and Welfare commissioned a group of experts to examine the health implications of consuming the illegal cooking oil. The FDA immediately released a list of 235 food companies around Taiwan that had reportedly purchased the tainted oil products. They also tested the tainted oil for any heavy metals, aflatoxin and benzopyrene, which may cause cancer in humans. However, they came out with a conclusion that products from the tainted oil do not pose any immediate health effects because 67% of the oil was still genuine, although the remaining adulterated materials require further examination.
 Minister of Economic Affairs Woody Duh urged the Taiwanese food companies to increase their level of alert when obtaining materials for their products and to make onsite inspections at their suppliers' production facilities. The Industrial Development Bureau of the ministry plans to implement a full-scale monitoring system to trace the sources of raw materials and check the quality of all finished processed food products to prevent future similar incidents.
 Investigators from the Ministry of Justice went through the bank accounts belonging to the companies and individuals involved in the tainted oil case to ensure all of their illegal gains were confiscated.
 The Ministry of National Defense removed all food products that could contain the tainted oil from its military stores serving the armed forces.
 The Criminal Investigation Bureau of the National Police Agency, accompanied by environmental and health officials, raided and swept the unlicensed Pingtung factory. Investigators found that the low-grade oil refined from food waste had been procured by several other companies and repackaged as lard oil to be sold to clients, and it was expected that at least around 200 tonnes of the oil had entered the market.
 The Department of Health of Kaohsiung City Government fined Chang Guann Co. NT$50 million, the highest that can be imposed on violations under Article 15-1 of the Act Governing Food Safety and Sanitation. The city's Economic Development Bureau also shut down Shun Te Enterprises after it was found to be unregistered.
 Two separate protests occurred in front of the Executive Yuan, on 12 September and 17 October, demanding the resignations of Jiang and later Ma.

International
The General Administration of Quality Supervision, Inspection and Quarantine carefully examined the records of the claimed-affected companies and restaurants. They also warned customers to be cautious of food products that may contain the tainted oil.

Secretary for Food and Health Ko Wing-man said that the Hong Kong Government would check whether any food imported into the region had any tainted oil from Taiwan. The authorities would try to trace the buyers of the tainted oil. On 10 October, health authorities ordered a total ban on and the recall of all animal oils imported from Taiwan.

The Government of Macau was criticized because of lax inspection of food ingredient imports, although the authorities had earlier said that at least 21 local food manufacturers and retailers had been using oils supplied by Chang Guann Co.

The Food and Drug Administration told businesses to pull questionable Taiwanese food products off shelves and said that the Philippines would accelerate signing a memorandum on cooperation with Taiwan on strengthening food safety checks.

The Agri-Food and Veterinary Authority of Singapore conducted tests on suspicious food items imported from Taiwan. The incident also prompted some retailers in the country to seek clarification from their Taiwanese suppliers. Travel agencies also prevented Singaporeans from buying suspected tainted products in Taiwan.

2014: Methyl yellow in tofu
In November 2014, it was found that dried tofu products (a.k.a. dougan 豆乾) have been adulterated with an industrial dye, methyl yellow (a.k.a. dimethyl), for some 20 years.  In December 2014, it was furthermore found that even regular non-dyed tofu has been found contaminated with carcinogens, resulting in over 25,000 kg recalled.

Tofu and seasoning products from Taiwanese manufacturers have been found adulterated in the latest of a string of related scandals beginning in November 2014.  The scandal was initially uncovered by Hong Kong authorities regarding the many flavored types of dried preserved tofu, that were recalled for toxic industrial dye methyl yellow contamination, after investigation it was confirmed that this adulteration had been going on undetected for over 20 years. A major supplier to 44 manufacturers, Chien Hsin Enterprises (芊鑫實業社) of Tainan city was implicated as the origin. Despite the fact that methyl yellow can often be detected by color (bright yellow), a further scandal erupted in the following days regarding regular tofu (white or oil color if fried). Regular tofu products were also found to be contaminated with a carcinogen.  At least 25,760 kg of deliberately contaminated emulsifier for tofu have been traced to the distributor.  In the following days, ramen noodle seasoning packets were also found to be contaminated with methyl yellow, include some popular major ramen manufacturers previously implicated in the prior gutter oil scandals  These products are exported worldwide, including United States, Singapore, Malaysia, Indonesia, Canada, Australia, Vietnam, Hong Kong, and China, in Western countries primarily on shelves of Asian food stores. As of December 18, 73 products have been recalled related to methyl yellow contamination.

References 

2011 health disasters
2011 in Taiwan
Adulteration
Food safety scandals
Health disasters in Taiwan
Scandals in Taiwan
2014 health disasters
2014 disasters in Taiwan
2011 disasters in Taiwan